The Old and the Young King (German: Der alte und der junge König) is a 1935 German historical drama film directed by Hans Steinhoff and starring Emil Jannings, Werner Hinz and Leopoldine Konstantin.

The film's sets were designed by the art directors Fritz Maurischat and Karl Weber. It was produced by a subsidiary of Tobis Film. Location shooting took place around Potsdam, including at the Garrison Church. Interiors were shot at the Grunewald and Johannisthal Studios. It premiered at the Ufa-Palast am Zoo.

Part of the tradition of Prussian films of the Weimar and Nazi eras, the film ostensibly deals with the intense conflict between Prussian King Friedrich Wilhelm I and his son and heir, Crown Prince Friedrich – the future King Friedrich II "The Great". This is a well-known incident of 18th century German history, which had drawn much public attention in the time itself, and been artistically treated before.

However, in its specific presentation of this historical theme, the film was clearly seen to be a work of Nazi propaganda aimed at extolling the Führerprinzip, i.e. blind obedience to the Leader (the King in the film's plot, Hitler in the reality for which the film was a parable); complaints of "encirclement" and the need for Lebensraum also feature.

For that reason, the film was banned by the Allied military government following the Nazi defeat in 1945. However, after the foundation of the Federal Republic of Germany the FSK ("Voluntary Self Regulation of the Movie Industry") subjected it to a test on 4 August 1958 and ruled that, unlike other films made under the Nazis, the propaganda element in it was not so blatant as to justify its inclusion in the list of "Forbidden Films" (:de:Vorbehaltsfilm).

Plot
The film opens at Potsdam in the time of "The Soldier King" Friedrich Wilhelm I of Prussia, with the Royal Family sitting at the breakfast table. It turns out that Crown Prince Friedrich, informally called "Fritz", had lost so much money at the gaming tables that he had to sign debentures. Members of the grenadier regiment had seen the crown prince appearing late in a wretched state, which greatly angers his father.  The King would like to prepare his son for the future role as a ruler, and regards his preoccupation with music and literature with much displeasure.

Fritz, for his part, is infuriated with the austere treatment by his father and hatches a plan to flee Prussia and get to France and England, where he expects a welcome from  his mother's family. His companion Katte would like to help him in this plan. However, being a second lieutenant bound by his officer's code, he at first declines.

The father-son conflict further escalates when Fritz accumulates even heavier gambling debts than those the King already had to pay off. The King insults the Crown prince, calling him "a liar and coward" and puts him under arrest. In the barracks, he is forbidden to engage in his beloved flute playing or read French literature.

At night the King returns earlier than usual and surprises the Crown Prince playing the flute in the music room together with his sister Wilhelmine. Katte, who was also present, manages to hide just in time. The angry King throws Fritz's books and flute into the open fire and orders the Crown Prince to accompany him on a trip to South Germany. Fritz, more than ever determined on his escape plan, can count on Katte's support after this incident.

However, the escape fails, and both the Crown Prince and Second Lieutenant Katte are condemned by a court martial to custody at the fortress of Küstrin. Indeed, the King goes much further, arbitrarily changing the judgement against Katte into capital punishment and insisting on having him actually executed.

The Crown Prince submits to the King's authority and is moved to better quarters in a palace. Nevertheless, in a visit by the King it is evident that the relationship between father and son is still very chilly and they are estranged. Fritz, who in the meantime has proved his "character," is now given his own household at Rheinsberg Castle where he can again follow his artistic inclinations.

Still, reconciliation between the estranged father and son does come about shortly before the death of the King. The last words of the Old King to the Young are: "Make Prussia great!" (The audience, aware of basic elements of German history included in their school curriculum, know that Friedrich would duly proceed to do just that.)

Cast

References

External links

Films of Nazi Germany
Films set in the 1730s
German biographical drama films
Films directed by Hans Steinhoff
Cultural depictions of Frederick the Great
Prussian films
German historical drama films
1930s historical drama films
Films with screenplays by Thea von Harbou
Biographical films about German royalty
Censored films
Tobis Film films
1930s biographical drama films
Films set in Berlin
Films shot in Berlin
Films shot at Johannisthal Studios
German black-and-white films
1935 drama films
Films set in the Kingdom of Prussia
1930s German films